G S Sanyal School of Telecommunications was established on 8 November 1996. The school, which is located in the Takshilla building of Ramanujam Complex offers M. Tech., M.S., Ph.D. and post-doctoral research facilities on telecommunications.

References

Universities and colleges in Paschim Medinipur district
Educational institutions established in 1996
1996 establishments in West Bengal